Priyanka Nalkari is an Indian actress and anchor who works in Tamil and Telugu television and films. She is best known for playing the titular role in Sun TV's show Roja.<ref>{{cite web | url=https://cinema.vikatan.com/television/126304-roja-serial-actress-priyanka-talks-about-her-acting-career | title=அப்போ ஹன்சிகா ஃப்ரெண்ட்... இப்போ தமிழ் சீரியல் ஹீரோயின்!" - 'ரோஜா' பிரியங்கா | publisher=Vikatan | date=30 May 2018 | accessdate=17 March 2020}}</ref>

Career
Priyanka is an Indian film and television actress native to Hyderabad. In 2010, she debuted in the Telugu film Andari Bandhuvaya directed by Chandra Siddhartha. She also played an uncredited role in Kick 2 (2015). Kanchana 3 (2019) is the first featured Kollywood film of Priyanka Nalkari. In 2018, she came to limelight after her portrayal in the Tamil serial Roja. Previously, she featured in the Telugu serial Meghamala which was aired on ETV Telugu. She has also featured in the comedy reality show Anubhavinchu Raja. She also portrayed the sister role of Sudheer Babu in Shiva Manasulo Sruthi (2012).

Filmography
 Films All films are in Telugu language unless otherwise noted''.

TV serials

TV shows

Awards

References

External links 
 

Living people
Actresses from Hyderabad, India
Indian film actresses
Indian television actresses
Indian soap opera actresses
Telugu actresses
Actresses in Tamil television
Tamil television actresses
Actresses in Telugu cinema
Actresses in Tamil cinema
Actresses in Telugu television
Telugu television anchors
21st-century Indian actresses
1994 births